The Rally New Zealand is an annual rally race in New Zealand. It was first included as a round of the World Rally Championship in 1977. The race is famous for its fast flowing gravel roads which carry the competitors through forests and alongside the New Zealand coastline.

It was first held in Taupo in 1969, and was subsequently staged in Canterbury, before moving back to the North Island in 1971. Auckland has hosted the majority of Rally New Zealand events. From 2006 to 2008 the event was based in Hamilton, with the service park, parc ferme and the super special stage all being located at the Mystery Creek Events Centre. In 2010 it returned to Auckland.

The WRC teams voted Propecia Rally New Zealand "Rally of the Year" in 2001. The 2007 Rally New Zealand ended with the closest-ever finish in the history of the World Rally Championship. After over 350 competitive kilometres, only 0.3 seconds separated the winner Marcus Grönholm and second-placed Sébastien Loeb.

No event was held between 2013 and 2016. As of 2020, the event is a part of the World Rally Championship, but was cancelled due to the COVID-19 pandemic in New Zealand.

Past winners

* denotes years when Rally New Zealand was not part of the World Rally Championship

Multiple winners

External links

 Official site
 FIA Page for Rally New Zealand
 Rally New Zealand at eWRC-results

 
Recurring sporting events established in 1969
New Zealand
New Zealand